Roderick R. McLennan (January 1, 1842 – March 8, 1907) was a Canadian politician.

Born in Charlottenburgh, Canada West, the third son of Roderick McLennan, McLennan worked in construction of railways and other public works, including sections of the Canadian Pacific Railway north of Lake Superior. He was a director of the Manufacturers' Life Insurance Company and was President of the Liberal-Conservative Association for Glengarry from 1885 to 1890. He was a Lieutenant-Colonel of the 59th Stormont and Glengarry Battalion of Militia. He was first elected to the House of Commons of Canada for the electoral district of Glengarry in the 1891 federal election. He was unseated in January 1892 and was acclaimed in the resulting by-election. He was re-elected in the 1896 federal election and was defeated in the 1900 election by Jacob Thomas Schell.

References
 
 

1842 births
1907 deaths
Conservative Party of Canada (1867–1942) MPs
Members of the House of Commons of Canada from Ontario